Nicolás "Nico" Terol Peidro (born 27 September 1988) is a Spanish professional motorcycle road racer, winner of the 125cc World Championship in . He has previously competed in the Superbike World Championship and the Supersport World Championship.

Career

125cc World Championship

Born in Alcoy, Province of Alicante Valencia, Spain, Terol began his professional racing career in 2005. He took his first international victory in the rain-shortened 2008 Indianapolis motorcycle Grand Prix as he was leading the race at the time of the final completed lap. He finished third in the 2009 championship, while he finished runner-up to Marc Márquez in the 2010 championship.

Moto2 World Championship
Terol moved up to the intermediate class, Moto2, for the  season. Terol endured a testing season, which finished with a third-place finish on home soil in Valencia. In , Terol won three races with the Aspar Team, en route to a seventh-place finish in the final championship standings. Terol struggled in the 2014 campaign, taking a solitary points-scoring finish – a 14th-place finish in Argentina – as he finished in 28th place in the final championship standings.

Superbike World Championship
Terol started 2015 competing in the Superbike World Championship with Althea Racing, riding a Ducati but left the team mid-season.

Career statistics

Grand Prix motorcycle racing

By season

Races by year
(key) (Races in bold indicate pole position, races in italics indicate fastest lap)

Superbike World Championship

Races by year
(key) (Races in bold indicate pole position, races in italics indicate fastest lap)

Supersport World Championship

Races by year
(key) (Races in bold indicate pole position, races in italics indicate fastest lap)

References

External links

 

1988 births
Living people
People from Alcoy
Sportspeople from the Province of Alicante
Spanish motorcycle racers
125cc World Championship riders
Moto2 World Championship riders
Superbike World Championship riders
Supersport World Championship riders
MotoE World Cup riders
125cc World Riders' Champions